The FIL World Luge Championships 1977 took place in Igls, Austria.

Men's singles

Women's singles

Men's doubles

Medal table

References
Men's doubles World Champions
Men's singles World Champions
Women's singles World Champions

FIL World Luge Championships
1977 in luge
1977 in Austrian sport
Luge in Austria